Mark Spitler is an American scientist, whose research includes photoelectrochemistry and semiconductor electrochemistry, spectral sensitization of solids, and sensors for detection of hazardous materials.  He is currently at the United States Department of Energy and is an Elected Fellow of the American Association for the Advancement of Science.

References 

Year of birth missing (living people)
Living people
Fellows of the American Association for the Advancement of Science
University of California, Berkeley alumni
Stanford University alumni
American scientists